Antonio Erman González (16 May 1935 – 2 February 2007) was an Argentinian politician. He occupied many charges during the presidency of Carlos Menem, like Minister of Economy, Minister of Health, Minister of Defense, Minister of Labour and President of Central Bank of Argentina. He also was National Deputy for Buenos Aires district and Ambassador of Argentina in Italy.

Born in La Rioja Province, Erman González received his CPA from the National University of Córdoba in 1960.

He was a close friend of president Menem and was accused on an arms trafficking scandal and was arrested once on these charges.

References 

1935 births
2007 deaths
People from La Rioja Province, Argentina
Argentine ministers of health
Argentine Ministers of Finance
Defense ministers of Argentina
Ministers of labor of Argentina
Presidents of the Central Bank of Argentina
20th-century Argentine politicians
National University of Córdoba alumni
Members of the Argentine Chamber of Deputies elected in Buenos Aires
Ambassadors of Argentina to Italy